The men's marathon at the 2010 European Athletics Championships was held on the streets of Barcelona on 1 August.

Background
A total of 70 runners were declared for the race. Of those, 20 were identified as contenders for medal positions, with Switzerland's Viktor Röthlin and Spain's José Ríos among the favourites. Also a contender was defending champion Italian Stefano Baldini, with the race billed as his return to racing after two years, since finishing 12th in the Olympic marathon. José Manuel Martínez, another Spaniard, was the leading European in the previous year's World Championships marathon where he finished eighth. Four of the Spanish runners warned before the race that heat and humidity would be the main handicaps to the competitors and force a slow and tactical race. The race would be run over four relatively flat laps of 10 km around the city of Barcelona.

Race details
The race started at 10:05 CEST with a field of 64 taking to the start line. It was run in hot conditions with the temperature at the start of the race  and the humidity rated at 74 per cent. The early pace was set by Russian Yuriy Abramov, winner of the 2010 Moscow Marathon. However, when he fell back, Röthlin was among the leading pack. The Swiss runner set a pace that the rest of the field could not compete with and he ran the final quarter of the race by himself to win by two minutes 19 seconds on Swiss National Day. Second place was home runner Martínez, who said he could not compete with Röthlin's pace so instead decided to hold a steady rhythm and not get involved in any counter-attacks. Bronze medal winner was Russian Dmitriy Safronov. Röthlin's victory was only the fourth gold for Switzerland at the European championships and their first since shot putter Werner Günthör won in the 1986 championships. Baldini's attempt to defend his title ended when he pulled out half-way through the race. Only 45 of the athletes finished the race.

The race also counted for the European Cup team result, with the teams decided on the fastest sum time of their first three athletes. Hosts Spain won the gold, ahead of Russia and Italy.

Reaction
Röthlin said after the race: "It's fantastic to do this on Swiss National Day. After everything that's happened over the past two years, this is incredible. I wouldn't have come had I not been in with a medal chance." He also made light of the warm weather, saying it was cool compared to the 2007 World Championships marathon in Osaka, Japan. Silver medalist Martínez said: "I just tried ... not [to] get involved with any counter-attacks as I've tried in the past and I'm very satisfied with my silver."

Medalists

Records

Schedule

Results

Final

See also
 2010 European Marathon Cup

References

Full results

Marathon
Marathons at the European Athletics Championships
European Athletics Championships
Men's marathons
Marathons in Spain